Bridge in Williams Township is a historic stone arch bridge spanning Frey's Run at Williams Township, Northampton County, Pennsylvania.  It was built in 1857, and is a triple-span, camelback shaped bridge.  The bridge property measures 80 feet long and 25 feet wide, and each semi-circular arch measures 15 feet wide and 10 feet long.

It was added to the National Register of Historic Places in 1988.

References

Road bridges on the National Register of Historic Places in Pennsylvania
Bridges completed in 1857
Bridges in Northampton County, Pennsylvania
National Register of Historic Places in Northampton County, Pennsylvania
1857 establishments in Pennsylvania
Stone arch bridges in the United States